Ridin' the Storm Out is the third studio album by REO Speedwagon, released in 1973. It peaked at number 171 on the Billboard 200 chart in 1981, and reached platinum status in 1989. It was the first album to feature Mike Murphy on vocals. The sessions started out with Kevin Cronin, but he left the band before the album was finished, due to creative differences. The title track would later become a hit for the band on their live album, after Cronin had returned to the band. The song refers to the band being stuck in a harsh winter blizzard after a show in Boulder, Colorado, at a bar named Tulagi (now closed).

The album includes a new composition by Stephen Stills, "Open Up", which was never recorded by Stills himself or any of his bands, although "Know You Got to Run" from Stephen Stills 2 is essentially an embryonic version of the song. "Know You Got to Run" consists of only verses and uses a sombre acoustic folk arrangement, while "Open Up" includes a chorus and uses an up-tempo rock arrangement.

Cronin's original version of "Son of a Poor Man" is featured on the compilation albums A Decade of Rock and Roll: 1970-1980, and The Essential REO Speedwagon. "Son of a Poor Man" and "Ridin' the Storm Out" were featured on the live album Live: You Get What You Play For. The studio version of "Ridin' the Storm Out" with Cronin on vocals was released on the compilation "Box Set Series" in 2014, "The Early Years 1971-1977" boxed set in 2018 and as a downloadable track in the music video game Rock Band.

Record World said of the title track that it has "a good mix of hard
rock guitar sounds and harmony vocals."

Track listing

Personnel
REO Speedwagon
Mike Murphy – lead vocals
Gary Richrath – guitar, lead vocal on "Find My Fortune"
Neal Doughty – keyboards
Gregg Philbin – bass
Alan Gratzer – drums

Additional personnel
Gene Estes – percussion
Guille Garcia – percussion
Joe Walsh – slide guitar on "Whiskey Night", "Open Up" and "Start A New Life"
Gloria Jones – backing vocals
Carolyn Willis – backing vocals
Oma Drake – backing vocals

Charts

Album

Certifications

Release history

References

REO Speedwagon albums
1973 albums
Albums produced by Paul Leka
Epic Records albums